Etteridge  is a small remote hamlet, situated close to Loch Etteridge in Inverness-shire, Scottish Highlands and is in the Scottish council area of Highland.

The main A9 road bypasses the hamlet.

References

Populated places in Badenoch and Strathspey